Yang Wenyi (born January 11, 1972, in Shanghai) is a former freestyle and backstroke swimmer from China, whose best performance was winning the gold medal in the 50 m freestyle at the 1992 Summer Olympics in Barcelona, Spain.

She was the first woman in history to go under the 25-seconds barrier in the 50m freestyle.

After retirement, she owned "Jinyi Sports Promotion Ltd", holding sports contests and running "Yang Wenyi Swimming Club". The club is located in Minhang, Shanghai.

High performances
 1987 – Pan Pacific Swimming Championships
Bronze – 4x100 m medley relay
 1988 – Asian Swimming Championships
 Gold – 50 m freestyle (24.98 WR)
 Gold – 100 m backstroke (1:03.08, Asian best)
 Gold – 4x100 m medley relay
 Gold – 4x100m freestyle relay
 1988 – Seoul Olympic Games
 Silver – 50 m freestyle
 1990 – Beijing Asian Games
 Gold – 50 m freestyle
 Gold – 100 m backstroke
 Gold – 4x100 m freestyle relay
 1991 – World University Games
 Gold – 50 m freestyle
 1992 – Barcelona Olympic Games
 Gold – 50 m freestyle (24.79 WR)

Honours
 1989 – Selected one of National Top Ten Athletes
 1989 – Voted one of forty Sports Stars in forty years since the founding of new China in 1949

See also
 World record progression 50 metres freestyle

External links
 Profile on Chinese NOC
 sports-reference

1972 births
Living people
Chinese female backstroke swimmers
Olympic gold medalists for China
Olympic silver medalists for China
Olympic swimmers of China
Swimmers from Shanghai
Swimmers at the 1988 Summer Olympics
Swimmers at the 1992 Summer Olympics
World record setters in swimming
Chinese female freestyle swimmers
Asian Games medalists in swimming
Swimmers at the 1990 Asian Games
Medalists at the 1992 Summer Olympics
Medalists at the 1988 Summer Olympics
Olympic gold medalists in swimming
Olympic silver medalists in swimming
Universiade medalists in swimming
Asian Games gold medalists for China
Medalists at the 1990 Asian Games
Universiade gold medalists for China
Medalists at the 1991 Summer Universiade
20th-century Chinese women